Just the Way You Are is a 1984 American comedy-drama film starring Kristy McNichol and Michael Ontkean and directed by Édouard Molinaro.

Plot 
Susan is a professional flautist in Philadelphia who has been handicapped since childhood and is forced to wear a leg brace to get around. She is all set to enter into a lavender marriage with her gay investment banker friend Frank in order to help him hide his sexuality so he can get ahead in business and get a big promotion, but decides not to when she realizes that the marriage won't meet her (or his) sexual needs. Shortly afterwards she accepts the offer to travel to Europe on a concert tour. While in Paris, she comes up with an idea to disguise her leg by putting it in a cast and travel on her own to the French Alps to be treated without pity. Not looking to find romance, Susan however has become the interest of Peter, a news photographer. They soon fall in love and Peter dumps his insufferable and narcissistic girlfriend Bobbie for her. Susan is forced to decide if she should tell Peter the truth about herself.

Main cast 
 Kristy McNichol as Susan Berlanger
 Michael Ontkean as Peter Nichols
 Kaki Hunter as Lisa Elliott
 André Dussollier as François Rossignol
 Catherine Salviat as Nicole Schallon
 Robert Carradine as Sam Carpenter
 Alexandra Paul as Bobbie 
 Lance Guest as Jack, The Answering Service Guy 
 Tim Daly as Frank Bantam
 Patrick Cassidy as Steve Haslachez 
 Gérard Jugnot as Desk Clerk, Hotel Monte Blanc 
 André Oumansky as Paris Doctor 
 Billy Kearns as Earl Cooper, Frank's Boss 
 Joyce Gordon as Answering Service Lady 
 Wayne Robson as Theater Assistant Manager 
 Jean-Claude Ostrander as French Ski Instructor 
 Garrick Dowhen as Bill Holland, American Ski Coach

Production 
The movie was filmed in Toronto and in France. In France, Kristy McNichol suffered an emotional breakdown while filming, and production had to be interrupted for a year while she recovered. Kristy said she was ready to go back to work within a month, but that shooting the snow scenes for the film's second-half would have to wait until the following winter. "It was the hardest thing I've ever done in my life getting through that film."

Reference list

External links 
 
 
 
 

1984 films
1984 comedy-drama films
American comedy-drama films
Films directed by Édouard Molinaro
Films scored by Vladimir Cosma
Metro-Goldwyn-Mayer films
Films set in the Alps
American skiing films
1980s English-language films
1980s American films
Films about disability
English-language comedy-drama films